Eois discata is a moth in the  family Geometridae. It is found in Singapore and on Borneo and Bali.

References

Moths described in 1898
Eois
Moths of Asia